Raymond Herbert Wise (born August 20, 1947) is an American actor.  He is best known for his role as Leland Palmer in Twin Peaks (1990–1991, 2017) and its prequel film Twin Peaks: Fire Walk with Me (1992), Vice President Hal Gardner in 24 (2006), The Devil in Reaper (2007–2009), and Marvin in Fresh Off the Boat (2015–2020), as well as his film roles in Swamp Thing (1982), RoboCop (1987), and Jeepers Creepers 2 (2003).

Early life
Wise was born in Akron, Ohio, graduated from Garfield High School in 1965 and attended Kent State University in Kent, Ohio. He is of Romanian descent on his maternal side. He grew up in a religious family; in the past he went to a Romanian Baptist church in Akron and later moved to a Methodist church.

Career

Television

In the late 1960s and 70s, Wise played attorney Jamie Rollins in the soap opera Love of Life for seven years and nearly 950 episodes. In 1987, Wise played Tom Gunther, Catherine Chandler's boyfriend, in the pilot episode of the TV series Beauty and the Beast. Wise is best known for his role as Laura Palmer's father Leland in Twin Peaks. In addition to Twin Peaks, Wise has played several roles in science fiction. He made an appearance as Liko in the Star Trek: The Next Generation episode "Who Watches the Watchers", later playing Arturis in the Star Trek: Voyager episode "Hope and Fear".

He appeared in the Season 7 episode "The Flame" of Diagnosis: Murder. He was featured in three episodes of Tim and Eric Awesome Show, Great Job! as Grill Vogel, the presenter of a fictitious instructional video series called "Business Hugs".

In 1995, Wise was reunited with Twin Peaks castmate Sherilyn Fenn in the NBC telemovie Liz: The Elizabeth Taylor Story. He also starred as the Devil on the TV series Reaper. Wise has appeared on a number of political-themed television series and films. He briefly appeared on The West Wing as California governor Gabriel "Gabe" Tillman, and played Vice President Hal Gardner on 24 in 2006. In August 2006, Wise made a guest appearance in the series Bones as the primary suspect of the first episode of the second season ("The Titan on the Tracks"), and in the pilot episode of Burn Notice. In Season 8, episode 13 of Law & Order: Special Victims Unit (2007), Wise guest starred as the head of a company testing pesticides on little children. Wise has also guest starred in two episodes of The Closer, as lawyer Tom Blanchard. He starred in Charmed as the upper level demon Ludlow, who runs a school for the Source Of All Evil in the episode "Lost and Bound". He had a small role in one episode of the sixth season of Dawson's Creek, playing Roger Stepateck. Wise starred in the 2009 SyFy original movie Infestation. He played the lead as Avery in a psychological thriller, Iodine, in 2009. He was a guest star on Psych and in 2010, in a special episode of Psych titled "Dual Spires", he joined his fellow Twin Peaks alumni Dana Ashbrook, Robyn Lively, Lenny Von Dohlen, Sheryl Lee, Catherine E. Coulson, and Sherilyn Fenn in a spoof of Twin Peaks.

Wise appeared in several episodes of Mad Men as Ken Cosgrove's father-in-law Ed Baxter, the CEO of Corning, Inc. He appeared in "Chinese Wall" (Season 4, Episode 11), "At the Codfish Ball" (Season 5, Episode 7), "Commissions and Fees" (Season 5, Episode 12), "To Have and to Hold" (Season 6, Episode 4) and "Severance" (Season 7, Episode 8).

In 2010, Wise guest-starred as fictitious sports agent Bobby Fox alongside a special guest appearance from real life ex-Yankees manager Joe Torre on the TV series Castle, in the Season 2 episode "Suicide Squeeze".  He also guest starred on Dollhouse as Howard, a higher-up in the Dollhouse organization. He stars in Kyle Rankin's post-apocalyptic horror thriller film Nuclear Family. Wise was announced the lead of the Mike Mendez thriller film Ov3rk!ll.

Wise appeared in Season 4 of Chuck and in the FX television show Wilfred as a popular TV personality. He was cast in the part of Robin Scherbatsky's father on How I Met Your Mother in December 2010 (after Eric Braeden declined to reprise his role in a cameo appearance), and ultimately appeared in 6 episodes of the series in total. Ray made a cameo appearance as a modeling agent in episode four of season 2 of Workaholics.

Wise made an appearance in 2012 in the TV series Rizzoli & Isles (Season 3, Episode 7, "Crazy for You") in drag as a cross-dressing judge. That same year, Ray played John Nelson, A disturbed ex-mortician obsessed with trying to help his wife Linda in the Criminal Minds Season 8 episode "God Complex".

Wise prominently appeared in the music video "Wishes" for the group Beach House. It was directed by Eric Wareheim and features Wise in a kind of dreamy, demented football halftime show.

Wise appeared as Andy Rooney parody Skip Reming on Newsreaders. In January 2014, he was hired to play the character of Ian Ward on the long running soap The Young and the Restless. He returned to Y&R in September 2015. He played the mayor in the first season of Deadbeat. Since 2014, he has appeared in multiple series on ABC. He had a recurring role as Marvin in the first two seasons of Fresh Off the Boat before being promoted to series regular for seasons three through six. He also appeared in the first two seasons of Marvel's Agent Carter as comic book character Hugh Jones.

In 2016, Wise appeared in the Netflix series Gilmore Girls: A Year in the Life. He portrayed Jack Smith, an old friend of Richard Gilmore, who becomes the boyfriend or companion of widow Emily Gilmore.

In 2017, he appeared as a guest in the TV series Fargo, as Paul Marrane, a kitten-handler and metaphysical punisher, in the episodes "The Law of Non-Contradiction" and "Who Rules the Land of Denial?"

Film
He played the character of Dr. Alec Holland in the 1982 film Swamp Thing, directed by Wes Craven and based upon the comic book series of the same name. Dr. Holland is the man who becomes the titular character after his lab is destroyed and he is left for dead. The actual Swamp Thing character was played by Dick Durock. 

In 1985, Wise was cast as Sol Gann, father to Natty Gann in the Disney film The Journey of Natty Gann, directed by Jeremy Paul Kagan, and then appeared as henchman Leon C. Nash in RoboCop (1987). He also had roles in Season of Fear (1989), The Rift (1990), Bob Roberts (1992), Grey Knight (1993) and Rising Sun (1993). 

He then played the roles of entrepreneur/millionaire Dalton Voss in The Chase (1994), Dr. Stripler in Powder (1995), Sheriff Blaidek in Evasive Action (1998), and Bart's father Harrison in The Battle of Shaker Heights (2003). The same year he played Jack Taggart in the horror film Jeepers Creepers 2, and portrayed father and husband Frank Harrington in the horror film Dead End. 

In 2005, he appeared as newscaster and commentator Don Hollenbeck in Good Night, and Good Luck, directed by George Clooney. In 2007 he appeared in The Flock as Robert Still. In 2008 he had a role in the horror remake One Missed Call. In the year 2011, Wise played the role of United States Secretary of State in X-Men: First Class. He appeared in Tim and Eric's Billion Dollar Movie as Dr. Doone Struts, the leader of the Shrim Healing Center. He appeared in Revelation Road: The Beginning of the End as Franks. He played Major Braxton Tanner in the movie Big Ass Spider! (2013). He was in Brother's Keeper (2013) and was in Suburban Gothic (2014). 

In 2014 Wise appeared in the documentary horror film Digging Up the Marrow under the direction of Adam Green. In 2016, Wise starred as attorney Peter Kane in the film God's Not Dead 2, who represents the ACLU in its fight to have the protagonist, Grace Wesley (Melissa Joan Hart), convicted of proselytizing in a public school.

Voice work
As a voice actor, Wise played Perry White in the movie Superman: Doomsday. He also plays Commissioner Gordon in the animated film adaptation of The Killing Joke.

Video games
He is also known for portraying Michael Dugan, President of the United States, in the full-motion video cutscenes for the computer real-time strategy game Command & Conquer: Red Alert 2 and its expansion, Yuri's Revenge.

Web series
In 2014, Wise starred in an original Chipotle web series titled Farmed and Dangerous; he played Buck Marshall in the satirical black comedy-type situation comedy. In 2018, Wise made a guest appearance in the second volume of Hyper RPG's horror anthology RPG, 10 Candles, explaining to the party the mysteries of the town of Kolob. He reprised that role in 2019 for the opening credits of 'Kollok 1991', another RPG series by Hyper RPG.

Personal life
Wise has been married to his wife, film producer Kass McClaskey, since 1978. They have two children together: a son, Gannon McClaskey Wise, born in 1985, who is an actor and writer; and a daughter, Kyna Wise, born in 1987, who is also an actress and a singer. Wise was previously married to actress Juliet Burr from 1974 until their divorce in 1977.

Filmography

Film

Television

Video game

Web series

Audio

References

Further reading
 Voisin, Scott, "Character Kings: Hollywood's Familiar Faces Discuss the Art & Business of Acting." BearManor Media, 2009. .

External links

 
 Ray Wise interview at sci-fi-online.com
 Ray Wise interview at time out Chicago
 Ray Wise Transcript Interview 12 December 1990 NPR

1947 births
American male film actors
American people of Romanian descent
American male stage actors
American male television actors
American male video game actors
American male voice actors
American Methodists
Kent State University alumni
Living people
Male actors from Akron, Ohio
20th-century American male actors
21st-century American male actors
Daytime Emmy Award winners
Daytime Emmy Award for Outstanding Guest Performer in a Drama Series winners